Scotch and Soda is a Dutch fashion retail company. Scotch & Soda is owned by an affiliate of Sun Capital Partners, Inc., with Frederick Lukoff serving as the current CEO.

History

In 2020, the brand launched sunglasses and eye glasses ranges for men and women, as well as its third perfume, ISLAND WATER.

On 16 March 2021 Scotch & Soda announced the launch of a new brand identity, as well as the acceleration of its global expansion, with the opening of 15 brick-and-mortar stores and 12 shop-in-shops over the following next 6 months.

References

Clothing brands
Clothing brands of the Netherlands
Clothing companies of the Netherlands
Dutch brands